Maximilian Pilger (born 25 February 1996) is a German swimmer. He competed in the men's 200 metre breaststroke at the 2019 World Aquatics Championships.

References

1996 births
Living people
German male swimmers
Place of birth missing (living people)
Swimmers at the 2014 Summer Youth Olympics
German male breaststroke swimmers
21st-century German people